Dylan Hartley (born 24 March 1986) is a former England Rugby captain who represented England and Northampton Saints. Hartley was the captain of England from January 2016 until the end of his international career in 2019. He is England's most capped hooker of all time, earning his first cap in 2008. Hartley captained England to a Grand Slam in 2016, the first time that England had achieved this since 2003, then back-to-back Six Nations titles and notably a historic 3-0 series win in the 2016 Cook Cup against Australia. In 14 domestic seasons with Northampton Saints Hartley captained the Saints for 8 years through their most successful period in the clubs 130 year old history.

Early career
Dylan Hartley was born in Rotorua, New Zealand. He attended Rotorua Boys' High School 

Although Hartley was born and grew up in New Zealand, his mother being English therefore automatically made him England-qualified. With this in mind Dylan set his sights on playing professionally in England. At 16 he left his native New Zealand and headed to England where he attended Beacon Academy. Within a year, Worcester Warriors had offered him an academy place and at 17 years old he joined and embarked on what ended up being a 16 year professional career with Northampton Saints and  England Rugby

Domestic career
Hartley joined Worcester Warriors' academy and represented the senior side once in the 2004–05 European Challenge Cup. 
Hartley joined the Senior Academy of Northampton Saints in the summer of 2005.

Hartley started in a 2006–07 Heineken Cup quarter final victory over Biarritz Olympique. That season, Northampton were relegated from the Premiership.

The following season Northampton won the EDF Energy Trophy and secured promotion from the RFU Championship. Hartley started for Northampton saints as they defeated Bourgoin in the final of 2008–09 European Challenge Cup. On 22 July 2009, Hartley was made Northampton Saints captain, replacing Bruce Reihana.

Hartley captained the losing Northampton sides in the 2011 Heineken Cup Final and also the 2013 English Premiership Final. 
In that final, Hartley was sent off for calling referee Wayne Barnes 'a fucking cheat.'
Hartley won the 2014 Premiership final against Saracens.

On 17 December 2014 Northampton announced that Hartley had extended his contract for a further three years, despite a more lucrative offer from French side Montpellier, with Hartley citing his desire to remain eligible for England selection as a deciding factor.

Hartley helped Saints secure a place in the Champions Cup for the 2017/18 season as the side saw off Stade Francais in the European Champions Cup play-off final to take the last spot.

On 7 November 2019, Hartley announced his retirement from rugby due to a knee injury that had kept him side-lined for all of 2019.

International career
Hartley represented England at age groups U18, U19s and U21s and in 2007 made his debut for the England Saxons, against Italy A.

Hartley received his first cap for England during the 2008 end of year rugby tests against the Pacific Islanders. Hartley made his first start for England against Argentina at Old Trafford in June 2009.

Hartley was named as the new England captain under Eddie Jones for the 2016 Six Nations Championship, replacing Chris Robshaw. England went on to win the Grand Slam and win back to back 6 Nations titles.

Hartley then captained the team who achieved England's first ever away series win against Australia in June 2016, and during the series became England's most capped hooker of all time. 

Under Hartley’s leadership England went on to win a world record equalling run of 18 test victories in a row.

Hartley was selected for the British and Irish Lions 2013 tour to Australia but missed it due to being banned after his red card sending off in the Premiership Final for calling referee Wayne Barnes a “f*****g cheat”.

 .

International tries

Disciplinary problems

Weeks banned
2007: 26 weeks
2012: 8 weeks
2012: 2 weeks
2013: 11 weeks
2014: 3 weeks
2015: 4 weeks
2016: 6 weeks
Hartley had a large number of disciplinary problems in matches amounting to a total of 60 banned weeks in his career.

In April 2007 Hartley was banned for 26 weeks for making contact with the eye of Wasps forwards James Haskell and Jonny O'Connor. The ban dealt an even bigger blow for Hartley as his hopes of joining the England World Cup squad were dashed and his club Northampton Saints were relegated in the same week. Hartley saw his second ban come 5 years later in March 2012, 8 weeks for biting the finger of Ireland forward Stephen Ferris in a Six Nations match. Then in December 2012 Hartley was banned for two weeks for punching Ulster hooker Rory Best in a Heineken Cup match. In May 2013 Hartley was sent off in the Aviva Premiership final against Leicester and banned for 11 weeks after being found guilty of verbally abusing a match official. This cost Hartley his place in the 2013 British & Irish Lions tour to Australia.

In December 2014, Hartley was banned for three weeks for an elbowing offence in the match against Leicester Tigers. His elbow made contact with the nose of winger Matt Smith. In May 2015, Hartley was found guilty of making contact with the head of opposite number Jamie George in the semi-final English premiership loss to Saracens at Franklin's Gardens. He was found guilty by the citing commissioner and banned for four weeks, putting his England Rugby World Cup 2015 selection in jeopardy, as he would be unavailable for the first week of the tournament. In December 2016, Hartley was banned for 6 weeks having caught Leinster Rugby player Sean O'Brien with a swinging arm to the back of the head in a European Champions Cup game.

References

External links
 
 Northampton profile
 England profile
 Career Stats@statbunker

1986 births
Living people
New Zealand rugby union players
New Zealand expatriate sportspeople in England
English rugby union players
Worcester Warriors players
Northampton Saints players
England international rugby union players
Rugby union hookers
Rugby union players from Rotorua
New Zealand emigrants to the United Kingdom